Toghin may refer to:

Toghin, Bazèga
Toghin, Boulgou
Toghin, Ganzourgou